Whatever You Need may refer to:
"Whatever You Need" (Tina Turner song), 2000
"Whatever You Need" (Meek Mill song), 2017
"Whatever You Need", a 1998 song by East 17 from Resurrection
"Whatever You Need", a 1995 song by Michael Speaks